The 2015 GP de Plouay featured as the tenth and final round of the 2015 UCI Women's Road World Cup. It was held on 29 August 2015, in Plouay, France. Lizzie Armitstead won, beating Emma Johansson and Pauline Ferrand-Prévot.

Results

World Cup Standings

References

GP de Plouay
GP de Plouay
GP de Plouay